Batocera thomsoni is a species of beetle in the family Cerambycidae. It was described by Javet in 1858. It is known from Borneo, Thailand, Malaysia, and Sumatra.

Varietas
 Batocera thomsoni var. bipunctulata Breuning, 1950
 Batocera thomsoni var. impunctata Breuning, 1950

References

Batocerini
Beetles described in 1858